Album of the Year is the third album by The Good Life. The limited edition release includes a second disc with an acoustic version of the album. The enhanced CD comes with footage of videos recorded February 3, 2004, at O'Leavers in Omaha, Nebraska.

This album is the 64th release of Saddle Creek Records.

Concept
The album is a concept record chronicling the end of a relationship and the emotions that come with it. The first track begins in April. The entire story is summarized in the first track, "Album of the Year." The main male character is dating a bartender, as referenced in the songs "Album of the Year" (She got a job at Jacob's/serving cocktails to the local drunks) and "Night and Day" (Night and day she tends to her bar/She pours the drinks, they pour out their hearts).

The first three songs talk mainly about the main character and his girlfriend, at the beginning of their relationship. "You're No Fool" is a glimpse into the ridicule the main character's girlfriend faces, as others speculate about her boyfriend's fidelity, and "Notes In His Pockets" lists several instances of his assumed unfaithfulness, as he cheats on her with ex-girlfriends and girls met in bars. These two songs do not explicitly say whether or not the infidelity actually occurred, leaving it to the listener to determine. "You're Not You" and "October Leaves" document the growing dissatisfaction with their relationship, from the point of view of the woman and the man, respectively. The relationship, at this point, is falling apart. At the end of "October Leaves", there is spoken word conversation between the man and woman, starting with the female's voice: 
-Hey?
-Yes?
-Are you sleeping?
-No.
-Can I ask you something?
-Yes.
-Are you cheating on me?
-No.
-Are you lying?
"Lovers Need Lawyers" has the main character defending his actions, claiming that he did not cheat on his girlfriend, and drawing metaphors to feeling like he is 'on trial'. "Inmates" is primarily sung by the girlfriend character of the album, and constitutes the end of their relationship. (Well guess what? I'm leaving./I can't be your prisoner.). The last three tracks deal with the male protagonists's life, post-breakup. We learn that the female protagonist has moved on ("A New Friend") and that the main character hasn't spoken to his now ex-girlfriend in two years ("Two Years This Month").

Track listing
 "Album of the Year"  – 5:10
 Tim Kasher – vocals, guitar
 Ryan Fox – guitar, twelve string
 Stefanie Drootin – bass
 Roger Lewis – drums
 Mike Mogis – mandolin, wurlitzer, keyboards, optigan
 Seth Stauffer – djembe, tambourine
 Michael Opoku – djembe
 "Night and Day"  – 3:29
 Tim Kasher – vocals, guitar, accordion
 Stefanie Drootin – organ
 Roger Lewis – drums
 Mike Mogis – mandolin, wurlitzer, organ
 Dan McCarthy – stand up bass
 "Under a Honeymoon"  – 4:52
 Tim Kasher – vocals, guitar, accordion, organ
 Ryan Fox – slide guitar
 Stefanie Drootin – bass
 Roger Lewis – drums, djembe, congas
 Mike Mogis – finger cymbal, cabasa, wurlitzer, guitar
 Seth Stauffer – djembe, doumbek
 A.J. Mogis – tympani
 Nate Walcott – trumpet, flugelhorn
 "You're No Fool"  – 3:50
 Tim Kasher – vocals, guitar
 Ryan Fox – piano, guitar, feedback
 Roger Lewis – drums
 Mike Mogis – wurlitzer, stomps, guitar
 Dan McCarthy – stand up bass
 A.J. Mogis – tympani, electric bass
 Nate Walcott – trumpet, flugelhorn
 "Notes in His Pocket"  – 3:42
 Tim Kasher – vocals, piano
 Ryan Fox – guitars
 Stefanie Drootin – bass
 Roger Lewis – drums
 Mike Mogis – wurlitzer, keyboards, guitar
 "You're Not You"  – 5:38
 Tim Kasher – vocals, guitar, accordion
 Ryan Fox – guitar
 Stefanie Drootin – bass
 Roger Lewis – drums, djembe
 Mike Mogis – guitar
 Seth Stauffer – djembe, congas, doumbek
 Michael Opoku – talking drum
 Amy Huffman – vocal chorus
 "October Leaves"  – 4:57
 Tim Kasher – vocals, guitar, synth bass
 Ryan Fox – guitar
 Stefanie Drootin – electric piano
 Roger Lewis – drums
 Mike Mogis – keyboards, glockenspiel, optigan, loops, wurlitzer
 "Lovers Need Lawyers"  – 2:40
 Tim Kasher – vocals, guitar
 Ryan Fox – synths, piano, guitar
 Stefanie Drootin – bass
 Roger Lewis – drums, tambourine
 Mike Mogis – keyboards, optigan, mellotron
 "Inmates"  – 9:39
 Tim Kasher – vocals, guitar, organ
 Ryan Fox – guitars
 Stefanie Drootin – bass
 Roger Lewis – drums
 Seth Stauffer – djembe, congas
 Mike Mogis – loops, keyboards, optigan, guitar, tambourine, shakers, dobro
 Tiffany Kowalski – violin
 Jiha Lee – vocals
 Jenny Lewis – end vocals
 "Needy"  – 3:52
 Tim Kasher – vocals, guitar
 Ryan Fox – guitar, synth lead, backward guitars
 Stefanie Drootin – bass
 Roger Lewis – bass
 Mike Mogis – loops, guitar, keyboards
 Amy Huffman – vocal
 "A New Friend"  – 3:29
 Tim Kasher – vocals, guitar
 Ryan Fox – guitar
 Stefanie Drootin – organ
 Roger Lewis – drums
 Mike Mogis – wurlitzer, loops, keyboards, sleigh bells
 "Two Years This Month"  – 2:12
 Tim Kasher – vocal, guitar, arrangement
 Mike Mogis – arrangement

Credits

The Good Life
 Tim Kasher – Vocals, Guitars, Keyboards, Accordion, Bass, Arrangement
 Ryan Fox – Guitars, Keyboards, Synths
 Stefanie Drootin – Bass, Keyboards
 Roger Lewis – Drums, Percussion, Bass

Guests
 Amy Huffman – Vocals
 Tiffany Kowalski – Violin
 Jiha Lee – Vocals
 Jenny Lewis – Vocals
 Daniel J. McCarthy – Bass
 A.J. Mogis – Percussion, Bass
 Mike Mogis – Keyboards, Guitars, Percussion, Loops, Mandolin, Dobro, Glockenspiel, Arrangement
 Michael Opoku – Percussion
 Seth Stauffer – Percussion
 Nate Walcott – Trumpet, Flugelhorn

References

External links
 Saddle Creek Records

2004 albums
The Good Life (band) albums
Saddle Creek Records albums
Albums produced by Mike Mogis
Concept albums